Seychellois Creole, also known as kreol, is the French-based creole language spoken by the Seychelles Creole people of the Seychelles. It shares national language status with English and French (in contrast to Mauritian and Réunion Creole, which lack official status in Mauritius and France).

Description 

Since its independence in 1976, the government of the Seychelles has sought to develop the language, with its own orthography and codified grammar, establishing Lenstiti Kreol (the Creole Institute) for this purpose.

In several Seychellois Creole words derived from French, the French definite article (le, la and les) has become part of the word; for example, 'future' is lavenir (French l'avenir). The possessive is the same as the pronoun, so that 'our future' is nou lavenir.  Similarly in the plural, les Îles Éloignées Seychelles in French ('the Outer Seychelles Islands') has become Zil Elwanyen Sesel in Creole.  Note the z in Zil, as, in French, les Îles is pronounced .

Samples 
(Lord's Prayer)

Ou, nou papa ki dan lesyel,
Fer ou ganny rekonnet konman Bondye.
Ki ou renny i arive.
Ki ou lavolonte i ganny realize
Lo later parey i ete dan lesyel
Donn nou sak zour nou dipen ki nou bezwen.
Pardonn nou pour bann lofans
Ki noun fer anver ou,
Parey nou pardonn sa ki n ofans nou.
Pa les tantasyon domin nou,
Me tir nou dan lemal.

49 fables of La Fontaine were adapted to the dialect around 1900 by Rodolphine Young (1860–1932) but these remained unpublished until 1983.

While Seychellois laws are written in English, the working language of the National Assembly is Creole and the verbatim record of its meetings provides an extensive corpus for its contemporary use in a formal setting.

(See also Koste Seselwa, the national anthem.)

Notes

References

 Annegret Bollée. 1977a. Le créole français des Seychelles: Esquisse d’une grammaire, textes, vocabulaire. Tübingen: Niemeyer. 
 D'Offay, Danielle & Lionnet, Guy, Diksyonner Kreol - Franse / Dictionnaire Créole Seychellois - Français. Helmut Buske Verlag, Hamburg. 1982. .

External links

Seychelles Creole Vocabulary List (from the World Loanword Database)
Seychelles Creole Magazine (Discover the Creole Culture)
Liv Servis online triglot text in English, French and Seychellois Creole digitized by Richard Mammana
Universal Declaration of Human Rights in Seychellois Creole

 
Languages of Seychelles
French language in Africa